Sweet Revenge is a two-part British television drama series, created and written by playwright Sandy Welch, that first broadcast on BBC1 on 15 October 2001. The series stars Paul McGann, Sophie Okonedo and Pam Ferris, and follows Patrick Vine (McGann), an enigmatic Professor, who, when not teaching History and Anthropology, runs a sideline in helping people get revenge. As a group of wronged Londoners employ Vine to help exact revenge upon those who have mistreated them, Ellen (Okonedo), who is seeking revenge on her cheating husband, gradually grows closer to Vine. The series was directed by actor David Morrissey.

The series broadcast over two consecutive nights, with the concluding episode following on 16 October 2001. The first episode drew 6.61 million viewers, while viewing figures for the second were unrecorded. The series is yet to be released on DVD; however, both episodes are available to watch for free on YouTube.

Production
The series was commissioned in March 2001, and Catherine Wearing and Sandy Welch, who previously collaborated on the critically acclaimed BBC adaptation of Our Mutual Friend, reunited for the first time in three years to bring the project to life. Filming commenced in April 2001; with a potential transmission set for the Autumn of that year. Having only previously directed a number of shorts, Sweet Revenge marks David Morrissey's "large-scale" directorial debut. Sarah Smart was the first actor confirmed for the series, revealing that she had been given the role of "a mousy student who is very downtrodden."

Cast

 Paul McGann as Professor Patrick Vine
 Sophie Okonedo as Ellen Lewis
 Pam Ferris as Denise Williams
 Richard Lintern as Peter Coin
 Amber Sealey as Chloe Dubois
 Enzo Cilenti as Will Pointon
 Steven Mackintosh as Sebastian Harper
 Christopher Naylor as Stuart Sharp
 Sarah Smart as Lisa Craig
 Susan Lynch as Madelaine Adair
 Bindya Solanki as Asha
 Tim Preece as Dr. Francis Symons
 Joe McGann as Young Patrick
 John Duttine as DI Briars
 John Johnson as Richard Horwood
 Oliver Porter	as Ben Adair
 Philip Delancy as Alex Carver
 Terence Vincent as Hendrix
 Rowland Davies as Judge Cady

Episodes

References

External links

2001 British television series debuts
2001 British television series endings
2000s British drama television series
2000s British television miniseries
BBC television dramas
English-language television shows
Films directed by David Morrissey
Television shows set in London